Offersøya or Offersøy is an island in Alstahaug Municipality in Nordland county, Norway. The  island lies directly between the large island of Alsta and the smaller island of Tjøtta at the mouth of the Vefsnfjorden. The Norwegian County Road 17 runs across the island connecting Alsta and Tjøtta. In 2016, there were 61 residents living on the island.

See also
List of islands of Norway

References

Alstahaug
Islands of Nordland